A national Internet registry (or NIR) is an organization under the umbrella of a regional Internet registry with the task of coordinating IP address allocations and other Internet resource management functions at a national level within a country or economic unit.

NIRs operate primarily in the Asia Pacific region, under the authority of APNIC, the regional Internet registry for that region.

The following NIRs are currently operating in the APNIC region:

 IDNIC-APJII (Indonesia Network Information Centre-Asosiasi Penyelenggara Jasa Internet Indonesia)
 CNNIC, China Internet Network Information Center
 JPNIC, Japan Network Information Center
 KRNIC, Korea Internet & Security Agency
 TWNIC, Taiwan Network Information Center
 VNNIC, Vietnam Internet Network Information Center
 Indian Registry for Internet Names and Numbers

The following NIRs are currently operating in the Latin American (LACNIC) region:
NIC Mexico
NIC.br

There are no NIRs operating in the RIPE NCC region.

See also 
 Country code top-level domain
 Geolocation software
 Internet governance
 Local Internet registry

References

External links
 APNIC website
 NIC Mexico website
 NIC Chile website

Regional Internet registries
Internet Assigned Numbers Authority
Internet Standards
Internet governance